Horton the Elephant is a fictional character from the 1940 book Horton Hatches the Egg and 1954 book Horton Hears a Who!, both by Dr. Seuss. In both books and subsequent media, Horton is characterized as a kind, sweet-natured and naïve elephant who manages to overcome hardships.

In 1942, Warner Bros. made the animated short film, Horton Hatches the Egg, in which Horton is voiced by Kent Rogers.

In 1970, MGM Animation/Visual Arts made a 30-minute TV special of Horton Hears a Who!. Horton is voiced by Hans Conried, who also lends his voice as the narrator.

Horton is voiced by Jim Carrey in the 2008 computer-animated adaptation of Horton Hears A Who!, where he is shown as being eccentric and imaginative, and sort of absent-minded.

Horton is also a character in the TV series The Wubbulous World of Dr. Seuss, as performed by John Kennedy. Horton is also a principal character in Seussical (2000), which uses most of the two Horton books as its primary plot. Kevin Chamberlin originated the role of Horton on Broadway.

Other characters

Horton Hatches the Egg
 Mayzie: A lazy bird who convinces Horton to sit on her egg, while she relaxes on Palm Beach. When Horton and his egg (now part of a traveling circus) visit near Palm Beach, she demands it, until it hatches into an "elephant bird". In the Broadway musical production Seussical, her full name is given as Mayzie LaBird.
 Hunters: Three game hunters who planned to shoot Horton, but decided to sell him to the circus to display his ability to climb trees. In the Seuss book, they are illustrated as gentlefolk, but in the 1942 cartoon, they look more like Yosemite Sam or Elmer Fudd.
 Morton the Elephant-Bird: A small animal resembling a winged elephant; hatched by Horton from Mayzie's egg and adopted and raised by Horton.

Horton Hears a Who!
 The Sour Kangaroo: A sour kangaroo and the head of the Jungle of Nool who mistrusts Horton's inquisitive nature as stupidity and does not believe that the Who's and Whoville exist, and attempts to destroy its locus in an attempt of convincing Horton. In the animated special and The Wubbulous World of Dr. Seuss, she is named "Jane Kangaroo". She is voiced by Carol Burnett in the film.
 The Young Kangaroo: The Sour Kangaroo's young joey, who supports his mother in all her speeches. In the film, he is named Rudy, and he believes in the Who's. In the animated special and The Wubbulous World of Dr. Seuss, he is named Junior. He is voiced by Josh Flitter in the film.
 Mayor of Whoville: The mayor of the microscopic world of Whoville; Horton's principal contact therein, and the source of information thereof. In the film, the mayor is named "Ned McDodd" and is the latest of a long lineage of mayors, and is the father of 96 daughters and a son. In the animated special, he is replaced with a scientist character named Dr. Hoovey. He is voiced by Steve Carell in the film.
 The Wickersham Brothers: A group of bonobo-like monkeys who work for the Sour Kangaroo and steal the flower upon which Whoville rests. They have a very large family, who help bind Horton. The main brother in the group is voiced by Dan Fogler in the film.
 Vlad Vladikoff: A black eagle that takes the flower that Horton protects and drops it in a huge patch of identical flowers. In the animated special of Horton Hears a Who!, his name is changed to Whizzer McWoff, and he appears more like a vulture than an eagle. Voiced by Will Arnett in the film adaptation, speaks in a Russian accent, and truly is a vulture yet made to resemble a condor.
 JoJo: One of the Who's: a small boy who, when exhorted by the Mayor, announces Whoville's existence to the larger world by shouting "YOPP". In Seussical, and the subsequent film, he is the Mayor's son; in the latter, he is voiced by Jesse McCartney.

Seussical
 Gertrude McFuzz: Although her original story did not feature Horton at all, Gertrude is a prominent character throughout the musical Seussical, in which she is Horton's next-door neighbor who falls in love with him due to his big heart. To attract Horton's attention, she artificially grows an impractically large tail. She helps Horton by locating the Who's in the clover patch and rescuing him from the circus, and in the end agrees to help Horton raise and adopt the elephant-bird (a half-calf, half-chick) and teach him about being both an elephant and a bird.
 Judge Yertle the Turtle: Although his original story did not feature Horton at all, he appeared towards the end of the musical sentencing Horton to a mental institution for his actions until they were proven true.

Horton and the Kwuggerbug
 The Kwuggerbug: A rude Kwuggerbug who enlists Horton to bring him to a tree full of delicious nuts, promising give him half when they get there, but forces him to undertake various hardships along the way while not intending to keep his word.

Stories
Horton Hatches the Egg: Mother bird Mayzie lays an egg, but becomes weary of incubating it, and persuades Horton to take her place. As Horton spends months at this, he suffers rainstorms, snowstorms, and the mockery of the other animals, while Mayzie relaxes abroad. When the three hunters approach him, Horton defies them to shoot him, while refusing to leave the nest. The hunters, realizing they have found a rare attraction - an elephant sitting on a nest - dig up the tree and sell him to a circus. When the circus arrives in Palm Beach, Mayzie goes to Horton demanding the return of her egg, but when the egg hatches, it produces the hybrid 'elephant-bird', who returns with Horton to the wild.

Horton Hears A Who!: Horton is bathing in a pond when he hears a speck of dust emit cries for help, and places it on a red clover for safety. Upon investigating, he learns that the speck of dust is a microscopic world named Whoville, inhabited by a microscopic species called Who's. When he talks to the Who's, the Sour Kangaroo and her son brand Horton as insane to the entire animal kingdom. When Horton retains the Who's, the Wickersham Brothers steal the clover and request Vladikoff to dispose of it, whereupon Vladikoff discards the clover among a field of identical plants. After a day of searching, Horton locates Whoville, but Mother Kangaroo arrives with an army of monkeys, to imprison him and destroy the clover. When the Kangaroos fail to hear a chorus of Who's announcing their presence, the monkeys attack Horton, who shouts at the Who's to prove themselves, but all their efforts fail until the Who child 'Jojo' shouts the syllable "YOPP!", breaking the sound barrier. The monkeys and Kangaroo apologize to Horton and promise to cooperate with him in protecting Whoville.

Horton and the Kwuggerbug: Horton walks through the jungle when he meets a Kwuggerbug, who tells him about a Beezlenut tree and offers to give him half the nuts if he brings him there. Horton, wanting the Beezlenuts, agrees. However, the bug turns out to be rude and demanding, and forces Horton to swim across a lake infested with crocodiles and climb a treacherous mountain to get to the tree on top, where he is then forced to stretch over a ledge to the tree to allow the bug to get to the nuts. When the bug gets the nuts, he cracks them, then points out that half of every nut is the shell, and he intends to give Horton the shells while he gets the insides. He jams the shells into Horton's trunk. Horton, in anger, and in pain from the shells in his trunk, sneezes, blowing the bug so far away he can never get back to the Beezlenut tree.

Other media
 Horton Hatches the Egg was made into a 10-minute cartoon for Looney Tunes in 1942 created by Bob Clampett. This was the first cinematic adaptation of a Dr. Seuss book.
 Horton Hears a Who! was made into a 1970 animated TV special directed by Chuck Jones, two short films produced in Ukraine and Russia respectively, and a 2008 CGI feature film by Blue Sky Studios.
 Both Horton books are part of the main plot in the 2000 musical Seussical. Horton is one of the main characters.
 The character lent its name to the company Hortonworks, founded in 2011.

References

External links
 Horton the Elephant at Don Markstein's Toonopedia.  From the original on February 5, 2016.

 
Dr. Seuss characters
Elephants in literature
Fictional elephants
Literary characters introduced in 1940
Male characters in animation
Male characters in literature